Riay Tatary Bakry (19 March 1948 – 6 April 2020) was a Syrian religious leader, chairman of the Union of Islamic Communities of Spain. He was imam of the Central Mosque in Madrid, Spain, as well as president of the Islamic Commission of Spain.

Biography 
He was born in Damascus on 19 March 1948. He settled in Spain in 1970 and studied Medicine at the University of Oviedo. He took part in the advisory committee for Freedom of Religion of the Ministry of Justice, being endowed the Encomienda of the Order of Civil Merit in 1998.

He was interned in March 2020 in the Hospital de la Paz due to COVID-19 along with his wife; Tatary died weeks later, on 6 April, at the age of 72 during the COVID-19 pandemic in the Community of Madrid. He was buried at the Muslim cemetery of Griñón.

References

Bibliography 

 
 

Deaths from the COVID-19 pandemic in Spain
21st-century Syrian people
20th-century Syrian people
Syrian imams
Spanish imams
Islam in Spain
University of Oviedo alumni
People from Damascus
1948 births
2020 deaths
Syrian emigrants to Spain